Justine Lavea (born 10 July 1984) is a former rugby union player. She represented  internationally, and Auckland provincially.

Biography 
In 2000, Lavea made her provincial debut for Auckland at the age of 16.

Lavea represented New Zealand at the 2009 Rugby World Cup Sevens in Dubai. She was a member of the 2010 Rugby World Cup champion side, she started in the final against England. She was also selected for the squad to the 2014 Rugby World Cup in France.

Lavea was named in the squad to tour Canada for the inaugural 2015 Women's Rugby Super Series. She is the younger sister of fellow Black Fern, Vania Wolfgramm.

References

External links
Black Ferns Profile

1984 births
Living people
New Zealand women's international rugby union players
New Zealand female rugby union players
New Zealand female rugby sevens players
New Zealand women's international rugby sevens players
Auckland rugby union players
Rugby union flankers